The Manistee Railroad in Michigan was a wholly owned subsidiary of the Flint and Pere Marquette Railroad (F&PM). It was established on June 19, 1880, to construct a branch line from the F&PM's main line (Ludington–Monroe) at Walhalla to Manistee. The completion of this line in 1883 gave the F&PM access to Manistee's lake trade and local salt mining operations. The Manistee Railroad was consolidated with the F&PM on January 30, 1889.

References 

Railway companies established in 1880
Railway companies disestablished in 1889
Defunct Michigan railroads
Manistee Railroad
Defunct companies based in Michigan
Predecessors of the Pere Marquette Railway
1880 establishments in Michigan
American companies disestablished in 1889
American companies established in 1880